The Trench is a 1999 British war film directed by William Boyd and starring Paul Nicholls and Daniel Craig. It depicts the experiences of a group of young British soldiers in the 48 hours leading up to the Battle of the Somme in 1916.

James D'Arcy, Cillian Murphy and Ben Whishaw also appear.

Synopsis
In the days leading up to the Battle of the Somme, lance corporal Dell shows the platoon his collection of softcore pornography.  Private Billy MacFarlane remarks to his brother Eddie that one of the girls looks familiar to him.  Their fun is broken up by Sergeant Winter, who then meets with their commander, Lieutenant Harte.  Harte informs him that the platoon will be "going over" in the third wave of the anticipated battle, carrying supplies in relative safety.  That night while on watch, Eddie is reprimanded by Sergeant Winter for trying to look through a hole in the trench.  When he gets off watch, Billy annoys him with questions about the girl from the photo he recognizes; Billy convinces himself it was a young woman named Maria who worked at the Post Office.

In the morning, the platoon are summoned to the ready in anticipation of an attack.  After a stand down, the platoon members again egg Eddie on to look through the hole.  Relenting, he sees and describes a scene of relative peace and beauty before being shot in the jaw and neck.  Billy looks on traumatized as Eddie is taken away on a stretcher.  Later, Private Deamis (Ben Whishaw) tries to console him, but is rebuffed.

A Colonel and Public Affairs division arrive and stage a motivational scene with the men, wherein the Colonel tells them that the forthcoming battle will be easy because the German army has been relentlessly bombarded by the British.  After an awkward, forced speech, the men are told to cheer.  As the Colonel leaves wishing them luck, Private Daventry remarks that he will not be with them.  Winter takes him aside and harshly admonishes him for his disrespect.  Later, after a pair of privates is sent on an errand, Billy comes upon their fragmented remains, having been hit by a shell.  He returns to Winter and Harte, further traumatized.

During a meal, Harte informs Winter that their captain has ordered them to issue a night patrol to bomb the German trench and review the status of their defenses.  Winter chooses Private Beckwith, and the two successfully bomb the trench and capture a German soldier fleeing their attack.  Beckwith remarks that the Germans appeared to be singing in their trench.  Though lance corporal Dell harasses the German, Daventry speaks to him briefly in German and tells the others that the German is the lucky one - clearly the Germans have not been wiped out as the Colonel said, and they are in good spirits.

On the morning of the attack, Lieutenant Harte informs Winter that another platoon has gotten lost during the night and that they will be going over in the first wave.  Winter sends Dell to retrieve the platoon's rum ration, but Dell drops it in shock after seeing a wounded man being carried past and realizes its contents.  He drinks a large amount before a shell knocks him down and breaks the bottle; he returns to Winter drunk. Winter requests Harte relinquish his personal whiskey for the men, but he refuses.  However, as the men line up, the Lieutenant relents and serves them all a share.  MacFarlane, apparently in good spirits, tells Winter his is afraid to go over the top.  Winters tells him that he can tell he is the type who will make it, and MacFarlane looks at the stolen picture of the girl he believes he has met from the Post Office.

When the men finally do go over the top, Winter is immediately shot in the leg but tries to hide it as he helps MacFarlane out of the trench.  He is shot several more times and eventually falls back onto MacFarlane, who struggles out of the trench.  As the men advance across no man's land, they gradually begin to fall, ending with MacFarlane being shot himself.

Cast
 Paul Nicholls as Pte. Billy Macfarlane
 Daniel Craig as Sgt. Telford Winter, the platoon sergeant
 Julian Rhind-Tutt as 2nd Lt. Ellis Harte, the platoon commander
 Danny Dyer as LCpl. Victor Dell
 James D'Arcy as Pte. Colin Daventry, a British soldier who starts to worry that they will not survive the war.
 Tam Williams as Pte. Eddie Macfarlane, Billy's older brother, who many believed has pressured Billy into signing up.
 Anthony Strachan as Pte. Horace Beckwith, an overweight Scottish soldier who is engaged to be married after the war. He is eager to kill German soldiers to avenge his friends who have died.
 Michael Moreland as Pte. George Hogg, a friend of Beckwith who becomes angry at him for keeping his engagement a secret from him.
 Adrian Lukis as Lt. Col. Villiers, the battalion's commanding officer
 Ciarán McMenamin as Pte. Charlie Ambrose
 Cillian Murphy as Pte. Rag Rookwood
 John Higgins as Pte. Cornwallis
 Ben Whishaw as Pte. James Deamis
 Tim Murphy as Pte. Bone, Lt Harte's aide
 Danny Nutt as Pte. Dieter Zimmermann, a German soldier captured by Winter and Beckwith

Critical Reception
The film appears to have been praised by critics for its personal take on the experience of the soldier as opposed to a more traditional action-oriented war film.  Variety described the emotional buildup to the final scene as having a "devastatingly hollow note", while the New York Times appreciated its subtle characterization of the platoon as "naive" in the face of a "demonized" enemy.  Despite the language used in the reviews, Variety and the New York Times submitted scores of 7 and 6 out of 10, respectively.  The film holds a 58 metascore on Metacritic.

References

External links
 
 

1999 films
Films about the Battle of the Somme
British independent films
Films with screenplays by William Boyd (writer)
British World War I films
1990s English-language films
1990s British films
Films about the British Army